Ryan Powell (born 1 July 1980 in Panteg) is a Wales international rugby union player. His position is scrum-half.

Career
He played for Northampton in the Aviva Premiership after playing for The Cardiff Blues. He joined Warriors from Cardiff Blues in March 2006 on a two-year contract. Powell had spent seven seasons at Cardiff Blues, making over 150 appearances for the club, and has played in over 20 Heineken Cup matches.

Powell made six appearances for Wales at scrum-half during 2002. He has three Wales caps and made his debut from the bench against South Africa on 8 June 2002 during Wales's Summer Tour to South Africa. Powell has been included in subsequent Wales Squads, including the 2003 RBS Six Nations but has yet to make another appearance for his country.

In February 2008, Powell signed a new deal at Worcester to keep him at Sixways until 2010. In May 2010 he signed for Northampton. His career ended in August 2011 when he was forced to retire due to a neck injury he had sustained earlier in the season.

References

External links
 Welsh Rugby Profile
 Worcester Warriors Profile
 Guinness Premiership Profile

1980 births
Living people
Rugby union players from Pontypool
Welsh rugby union players
Worcester Warriors players
Northampton Saints players
Wales international rugby union players
Rugby union scrum-halves